The Bavaria Solarpark is a group of three photovoltaic power stations in different locations in Germany. 
Its total capacity amounts to 10 megawatts (MW) and consists of the following distinct solar farms south of Neumarkt in der Oberpfalz, in Bavaria:
 The 6.3 MW Solarpark Mühlhausen 
 The 1.9 MW Solarpark Günching
 The 1.9 MW Solarpark Minihof

The Bavaria Solarpark was constructed and is operated by the American company SunPower. 
It consists of 57,600 solar panels (model PowerLight NT-5AE3D by Sharp) mounted on SunPower's solar trackers and covers a total area of 40 hectares (99 acres). 
Inaugurated on 30 June 2005, the solar farm was grid-connected six months later in December 2005. 
For a few months, the Solarpark Mühlhausen was the world's largest photovoltaic power station.

See also

Photovoltaic power stations
Solar power in Germany

References

Photovoltaic power stations in Germany